Michael Kent Young (born May 1, 1963) is an American college basketball coach and currently the head men's basketball coach at Virginia Tech. He was hired  on April 7, 2019, after a 17-year stint where he went 299–244 as the head coach at Wofford College.

Career
Born in Radford, Virginia, Young played collegiately at Emory & Henry College. After completing his career, which included serving as team captain during his junior and senior seasons, Young began his coaching career as an assistant coach at his alma mater. In 1988, he left Emory & Henry to serve one year as an assistant to Oliver Purnell at Radford University.

In 1989, Young began his tenure as an assistant coach at Wofford. He would go on to spend the next 30 years at the school, helping to guide the Terriers in their transition from Division II to Division I independent status, and finally to a spot in the Southern Conference, where the Terriers compete today.

In December 2001, Wofford announced that then-head coach Richard Johnson would be promoted to athletic director, leaving Young to take control of the team starting for the 2002–03 season. His first six years were fairly uneventful, with high points of a .500 conference record in his first season, and overall records of .500 during the 2004–05 and 2007–08 seasons.

However, 2008–09 saw new school records in the Division I era, marking the Terriers' first winning season as a Division I school and the first winning SoCon record in school history. In 2009–10, Young continued to build on this success, leading the Terriers to the Southern Conference regular season and tournament championships, which earned Wofford its first bid to the NCAA tournament. In recognition of his achievements, Young was named the 2010 Southern Conference Coach of the Year , as well as the Hugh Durham National Coach of the Year .

On December 21, 2017, Young led Wofford to a stunning 79-75 win over #5 North Carolina, giving the program its first ever win over a top 25 team. The next season, it defeated Seton Hall 84-68 in the 2019 NCAA Division I men's basketball tournament for the first NCAA Tournament win of Young's career. On November 5, 2019, Young recorded his 300th win, and first win as Virginia Tech's men's basketball coach, by defeating Clemson 67-60.

On November 20, 2019, Young led Virginia Tech to a 100-64 win over Delaware State, giving the program a new school record and also set an ACC record with its 21 3-pointers made. On November 25, 2019, Young led Virginia Tech to a 71-66 victory over No. 3  Michigan State in the Maui Invitational, Young's first victory over a ranked team as head coach of the Hokies. At the close of the 2020–21 regular season, Young was named the ACC Coach of the Year.

On March 12, 2022, Young led the Hokies to the ACC Tournament title for the first time in school history. The tournament final was played against Mike Krzyzewski's Duke Blue Devils in Coach K's final ACC tournament game. Tech, the seven seed, won 82-67 and only reached the final after beating Clemson, Notre Dame, and North Carolina in consecutive nights. The Hokies were the first seven seed to win the tournament in its long history.

Head coaching record

References

External links
 Virginia Tech profile

1963 births
Living people
American men's basketball coaches
American men's basketball players
Basketball coaches from Virginia
Basketball players from Virginia
College men's basketball head coaches in the United States
Emory and Henry Wasps men's basketball coaches
Emory and Henry Wasps men's basketball players
People from Radford, Virginia
Radford Highlanders men's basketball coaches
Virginia Tech Hokies men's basketball coaches
Wofford Terriers men's basketball coaches